Basil of Seleucia was a Roman Bishop and ecclesiastical writer. He was archbishop of Seleucia ad Calycadnum by 448. He condemned Eutyches in the year 448, he "acquiesced" while "rehabilitating" at the Latrocinium in 449, "but recanted and signed" the Tome of Leo in 450.

Biography
His date of birth is uncertain; he died probably between 458 and 460, although Oxford cites his death at after 468; was distinguished during the period when the Eastern Church was convulsed by the Eutychian controversy, and was necessarily obliged to take sides in all the attendant disputes. Those of his writings which have come down to us, though perhaps too rhetorical and involved, suggest that he was a man of great literary ability.

He was appointed Bishop of Seleucia in Isauria, between the years 432 and 447, and was one of those who took part in the Synod of Constantinople, which was summoned in 448 by Patriarch Flavian of Constantinople to assess the faith of the archimandrite Eutyches. Although in Constantinople he accepted Eutyches' condemnation, he attended the Second Council of Ephesus the next year (449), where he voted for the rehabilitation of Eutyches and for the deposition of the Patriarch of Constantinople.  Later, at Chalcedon, he claimed that he had felt obliged to submit to the authority of the other bishops at Ephesus, particularly Dioscurus of Alexandria. 
 
Like many who had submitted to Dioscurus at Ephesus, he went on to accept the condemnation of both Eutyches and Dioscurus at Chalcedon. Throughout the turmoil, however, his personal confession remained consistent: the one Christ is fully human and fully divine, and either 'one nature' or 'two nature' language is orthodox if rightly understood. He is particularly notable for originating the qualified Dyophysite formula promulgated in the Chalcedonian definition: 'made known in two natures'.  After Chalcedon, he seems to have continued a zealous opponent of the Miaphysite party, and in the year 458 he joined with his fellow-bishops of Isauria, in an appeal to the Emperor Leo I, requesting him to use his influence in forwarding the Decrees of Chalcedon, and in securing the deposition of Timotheus Aelurus, who had intruded himself in 457 into the Patriarchate of Alexandria. This is the last reference we find to Basil, and it is commonly supposed that he died shortly afterwards.

Writings
Forty-one sermons (logoi) on different portions of the Old Testament have come down to us under his name, and are found in Migne, where is also his history of the protomartyr Thecla and of the miracles wrought at her grave. Most of these sermons may be regarded as genuine, though some of them are now generally assigned to Nestorius.

According to Photius, Basil also dealt in verse with the life and miracles of Saint Thecla. This, however, was a poem and is not the same as the prose Life and Miracles of Saint Thecla.

References

5th-century_bishops_in_Roman_Anatolia